Live In Stuttgart (One-Off Shit Let's Go!) is a rare live album by Atari Teenage Riot. Initially released on cassette, the album predates the infamous Live at Brixton Academy noise-fest, and features a bizarre blend of live instrumentation and spoken word pieces from various songs.

Aside from ATR members Alec Empire, Carl Crack and Hanin Elias, the line-up for the performance also includes fellow DHR act EC8OR (Gina V. D'Orio on guitar and Roland Braun on drums).

Track listing
(Untitled)
(Untitled)

External links
Live In Stuttgart (One-Off Shit Let's Go!) at Discogs
Official Digital Hardcore Recordings site

Atari Teenage Riot albums
1996 live albums